Aloma's Ruler (1979–2003) was an American Thoroughbred racehorse who won the second leg of the 1982 U.S. Triple Crown series, the Preakness Stakes.

Background

Aloma's Ruler was purchased for $92,000 at the 1981 Hialeah, Florida sale of two-year-olds  by Baltimore, Maryland businessman Nathan "Red" Scherr (1923–2003), who was advised by trainer John Lenzini Jr.

Racing career
Sent to the track at age two, Aloma's Ruler won one stakes race. At age three in 1982, under star jockey Ángel Cordero Jr. he won the Bahamas Stakes at Hialeah Park Race Track on January 7. With a new rider, sixteen-year-old Jack Kaenel, he captured the May 8 Withers Stakes at Aqueduct Racetrack. Then, with Kaenel again in the saddle for the biggest win of his career, he defeated prohibitive favorite Linkage in the Preakness Stakes at Pimlico Race Course. In a race devoid of early speed, Aloma's Ruler made the lead easily, slowed the pace down the back stretch, and held on to win.  He finished ninth over a sloppy track in the Belmont Stakes and with Ángel Cordero Jr. back on board, won the Jersey Derby at Monmouth Park in July. Aloma's Ruler came out of a second-place finish on August 2t Travers Stakes at Saratoga Race Course with an ankle injury that ended his racing career.

Breeding record
Retired to stud, Aloma's Ruler met with limited success. From his eighteen crops, he sired six stakes winners.

Aloma's Ruler died from an apparent heart attack at age twenty-four on June 21, 2003, at an Illinois farm.

Pedigree

External links
 1982 Preakness Stakes race video

References

1979 racehorse births
2003 racehorse deaths
Racehorses bred in Florida
Racehorses trained in the United States
Preakness Stakes winners
American Grade 1 Stakes winners
Thoroughbred family 9-h